Preston Wynne is a small village and civil parish in Herefordshire, England. Civil parish population at the 2011 census was 172.

The hamlet of Preston Marsh is to the east of the village. Within the parish is the site of a medieval chapel and ancient ring ditches.

External links

Group Parish's website

Villages in Herefordshire
Civil parishes in Herefordshire